The War of the Quadruple Alliance (1718–1720; , ,) was caused by Spanish attempts to recover territories in Italy ceded in the 1713 Peace of Utrecht. Largely focused on Sicily, it included minor engagements in North America and Northern Europe as well as the Spanish-backed Jacobite rising of 1719 in Scotland.

In August–October 1717, Spain recaptured Sardinia from Habsburg Austria with little opposition, which it then followed by a landing in Sicily in July 1718. On 2 August 1718, a Quadruple Alliance was formed by Britain, France, Austria, and the Dutch Republic. The war ended with the 1720 Treaty of The Hague, which restored the position prior to 1717, but with Savoy and Austria exchanging Sardinia and Sicily.

Background

Following the War of the Spanish Succession, Spain recovered remarkably quickly thanks to reforms initiated by chief minister Giulio Alberoni, supported by his fellow Italian Elisabeth Farnese, who became Philip V's second wife in 1714. In the 1713 Peace of Utrecht, Spain had ceded its possessions in Italy and Flanders to Habsburg Austria, and the Kingdom of Sicily to Savoy; recovering them was a priority for the new administration of Philip V of Spain.

The 1701 to 1714 war was fought to ensure neither France or the Habsburg monarchy could ever be united with Spain but Philip now cast doubts on his renunciation of the French throne agreed at Utrecht. Charles VI of Austria also refused to formally accept this principle, and also delayed implementation of the Dutch Barrier in the newly acquired Austrian Netherlands, an objective for which the Dutch Republic had effectively bankrupted themselves. In late 1716, former opponents Britain and France agreed an Anglo-French alliance to ensure enforcement of Utrecht; in January 1717, these two and the Dutch formed the Triple Alliance.
 
The alliance's key principles were that Charles and Philip should confirm that they renounced their respective claims to the thrones of Spain and France, while Savoy and Austria should exchange Sicily and Sardinia. Spain saw little benefit in this and decided to seize the opportunity to recover territorial losses agreed at Utrecht. As neither Savoy nor Austria possessed significant navies, the most obvious targets were the islands of Sardinia and Sicily, an ambition that aligned with the Italian dynastic claims of Elizabeth Farnese.

In August 1717, Spanish forces landed on Sardinia and by November had re-established control of the island. They met little opposition; Austria was engaged in the 1716–1718 Austro-Turkish War, while France and the Netherlands needed peace to rebuild their shattered economies. Attempts to resolve the situation through diplomacy failed and in June 1718, a British naval force arrived in the Western Mediterranean as a preventive measure. Emboldened by their success in Sardinia, in July 1718 the Spanish landed 30,000 men on Sicily but the strategic position had now changed. Austria signed the July 1718 Treaty of Passarowitz with the Ottoman Empire, and on 2 August, joined Britain, France, and the Dutch in the Quadruple Alliance, which gave its name to the war that followed. The Treaty of London, the defence pact that established the Quadruple Alliance, was written in Latin and signed  on 2 August 1718 (Old Style: 22 July 1718).

War

Outbreak
The Spanish took Palermo on 7 July, then divided their army; on 18 July, Marquess of Lede opened the siege of Messina, while the duke of Montemar occupied the rest of the island. On 11 August, a British squadron commanded by Sir George Byng eliminated the Spanish fleet at the Battle of Cape Passaro. This was followed in the autumn by the landing of a small Austrian army, assembled in Naples by the Austrian Viceroy Count Wirich Philipp von Daun, near Messina to lift the siege by the Spanish forces. The Austrians were defeated in the First Battle of Milazzo on 15 October, and only held a small bridgehead around Milazzo.

In 1718, Cardinal Alberoni began plotting to replace the Duc d'Orléans, regent to the 5-year-old King Louis XV of France, with Philip V. This plot became known as the Cellamare conspiracy. After the plot was discovered, Alberoni was expelled from France, which declared war on Spain. By 17 December 1718, the French, British, and Austrians had all officially entered the war against Spain. The Dutch would join them later, in August 1719.

San Sebastián

The Duc d'Orléans ordered a French army under the Duke of Berwick to invade the western Basque districts of Spain in April 1719, still under the shock of Philip V's military intervention against them. Berwick successfully besieged San Sebastián and also entered northern Catalonia. In both regions there was support for the invaders from leading local figures, some of whom lobbied for them to be permanently annexed by France. Spain attempted to counter this by launching its own expedition to Brittany, in the hope of raising a rebellion against the Regent of France. It consisted of a 1,000 troops, but carried arms for 10,000 more. However, after landing at Vannes they found little support amongst the inhabitants and withdrew.

Sicily
In Sicily, the Austrians started a new offensive under Count Claude Florimond de Mercy. They first suffered a defeat in the Battle of Francavilla (20 June 1719). But the Spanish were cut off from their homeland by the British fleet and it was just a matter of time before their resistance would crumble. Mercy was then victorious in the second Battle of Milazzo, took Messina in October and besieged Palermo.

Invasion of Britain

In early 1719 that the Irish exile, the Duke of Ormonde, organized an expedition with extensive Spanish support to invade Britain and replace King George I with James Stuart, the Jacobite "Old Pretender". However, his fleet was dispersed by a storm near Galicia in March 1719, and never reached Britain.

A small force of 300 Spanish marines under George Keith, 10th Earl Marischal did land near Eilean Donan, but they and the Highlanders who supported them were defeated at the Battle of Eilean Donan in May 1719 and the Battle of Glen Shiel a month later, and the hopes of an uprising soon fizzled out.

Vigo

In retaliation for this attack, the British government prepared to launch a raid on the Spanish coast. An expedition was assembled at Portsmouth and the Isle of Wight under the command of Lord Cobham and George Wade. They successfully captured Vigo and marched inland seizing the towns of Redondela and Pontevedra in October 1719. This caused some shock to the Spanish authorities as they realized how vulnerable they were to Allied amphibious attacks, with the potential to open up a new front away from the French frontier.

North America
The French captured the Spanish settlement of Pensacola in Florida in May 1719, pre-empting a Spanish attack on South Carolina. While Spanish forces retook the town in August 1719, it fell to the French again towards the end of the year and they destroyed the town before withdrawing.

In February 1720 a 1,200 strong Spanish force set out from Cuba to take the British settlement of Nassau in the Bahamas. After taking a large amount of plunder they were eventually driven off by the local militia.

Peace

Displeased with his kingdom's military performance, Philip dismissed Alberoni in December 1719, and made peace with the allies with the Treaty of The Hague on 17 February 1720.

In the treaty, Philip was forced to relinquish all territory captured in the war. However, his third surviving son's right to the Duchy of Parma and Piacenza after the death of Elisabeth's childless uncle, Antonio Farnese, was recognized.

France returned Pensacola and the remaining conquests in the north of Spain in exchange for commercial benefits. Included in the terms of this treaty, Victor Amadeus was forced to exchange Sicily for that of the less important Kingdom of Sardinia.

Legacy
The war provided a unique example during the eighteenth century when Britain and France were on the same side. It came during a period between 1716 and 1731 when the two countries were allies. Spain would later join with France in the Bourbon Compact, and the two would become enemies of the British once more.

Spain regained the Kingdom of Naples during the War of the Polish Succession (1733–1735).

See also
 Triple Alliance (1717)
 Peace of Vienna (1725)

References

Sources
 
 
 
 
 
 
 
 
 

Wars involving the Habsburg monarchy
Wars involving France
Wars involving Great Britain
Wars involving the Holy Roman Empire
Wars involving Spain
Wars involving the Dutch Republic
Wars involving the Netherlands
18th-century conflicts
Conflicts in 1718
Conflicts in 1719
Conflicts in 1720
18th century in Austria
1718 in Europe
1719 in Europe
1720 in Europe
Wars fought in Texas
Wars of succession involving the states and peoples of North America
Wars of succession involving the states and peoples of Europe